Emeralds, previously known as Super Strikers, were an English women's cricket team that competed in the Super Fours. The squad varied from season to season, but was made up of some of the top players in English cricket. They were captained by various England players, including Claire Taylor and Arran Brindle. They were the only Super Fours side to never win a competition.

History

2002–2005: Super Strikers
The Super Fours was established in 2002 as a way of bridging the gap between women's county cricket and international cricket, bringing together the top players in England. Super Strikers was one of the teams established, and was captained by Claire Taylor. They finished 4th in the first 50 over tournament that took place, winning 2 out of 6 games. The Super Strikers achieved their best finishes in 2003 and 2005, when they finished 2nd, but overall were the worst-performing Super Fours side.

2006–2013: Emeralds
In 2006 the side was renamed Emeralds, but brought little change in fortunes, as they finished bottom of the 50 over group, and 3rd in the Twenty20 tournament. Emeralds did not find much improvement over subsequent years, failing to finish above 3rd in the 50 over tournament. They did reach the Twenty20 final in the last Super Fours season, 2013, but lost to Sapphires by 5 wickets.

Seasons

Super Fours

Super Fours Twenty20

References

2002 establishments in England
Super Fours teams